Dominique Martin may refer to:

 
 Dominique Martin (politician)
 Dominique Martin (professor) from Bordeaux Segalen University
 Dominique Martin (film editor) known for Flesh Color
 Dominique Martin, football player of the Green Bay Packers